Pratto is a surname. Notable people with the surname include:

Felicia Pratto (born 1961), social psychologist
Lucas Pratto (born 1988), Argentine footballer
Nick Pratto (born 1998), American baseball player